Aabraham Benjamin Bah Kofi was a Ghanaian diplomat and businessman who served as Ghana's Ambassador to the United States of America from 1966 to 1967.

Early life and education 
Bah Kofi was born in 1917 in Ghana (then Gold Coast). He received his early education in Ghana prior to entering the University College, Southampton, England for his undergraduate studies. He obtained his postgraduate degree in International Law and Institutions at the London School of Economics,  a member institution of the federal University of London.

Career 
After his studies abroad, Bah Kofi entered the Colonial Civil Service, he worked for the Postal Service and subsequently joined the Ghana Foreign Service in 1956. in 1957, he was appointed Ghana's first chargé d' affaires in Monrovia, Liberia. He served in this capacity from 1957 to 1958. in 1959, he became the deputy Ghana High Commissioner in London. In 1960, he returned to Ghana to serve as principal assistant secretary to the Ministry of Foreign Affairs, and a year later, he was promoted to the post of principal secretary. in 1962, he became the first Ghanaian High Commissioner to Pakistan. On 8 August 1966 he became Ghana's ambassador to the United States of America. He held this appointment until 28 September 1967. He represented Ghana at several conferences and was also a member of various delegations while serving in the Foreign Service.

References 

Ghanaian diplomats
1917 births
Alumni of the London School of Economics
Alumni of the University of Southampton
Year of death missing